Kathy May Fritz (born June 18, 1956) is an American former professional tennis player. She reached three Grand Slam quarterfinals, once at the US Open in 1978 and twice at the French Open in 1977 and 1978. She won seven WTA singles titles during her career, and achieved a career-high ranking of world no. 10 in 1977.

She also competed under the names Kathy May Teacher after her marriage in 1979 to tennis player Brian Teacher, and  Kathy May-Paben. Her son Taylor Fritz is also a professional tennis player, and he was the 2015 ITF Junior World Champion.

Early and personal life
May was born and grew up in Beverly Hills, California. She is the great-granddaughter of David May, founder of The May Department Stores Company (now Macy's).

In 1979, she married fellow Californian player Brian Teacher, also a top 10 tennis player and the 1980 Australian Open champion; they subsequently divorced. She married fireman Donn Paben in 1981 with whom she had two sons, and subsequently divorced. She later married Guy Fritz, her third husband, and had her third son Taylor Fritz.

Tennis career
She reached three Grand Slam quarterfinals, once at the US Open in 1978 and twice at the French Open in 1977 and 1978. She won seven WTA singles titles during her career, and achieved a career-high ranking of world no. 10 in 1977.

She was coached by Tony Trabert.

WTA Tour finals

Singles: 7 (7–0)

Doubles: 7 (4–3)

Grand Slam singles tournament timeline

Note: The Australian Open was held twice in 1977, in January and December.

See also

List of female tennis players

References

External links
 
 

1956 births
Living people
American female tennis players
American people of German-Jewish descent
Jewish American sportspeople
Jewish tennis players
Sportspeople from Beverly Hills, California
Tennis people from California
May family
21st-century American Jews
21st-century American women